The Prevention of Terrorism Acts were a series of Acts of the Parliament of the United Kingdom from 1974 to 1989 that conferred emergency powers upon police forces where they suspected terrorism.

The direct ancestor of the bill was the Prevention of Violence Act 1939 (Temporary Provisions) which was brought into law in response to an Irish Republican Army (IRA) campaign of violence under the S-Plan. The Prevention of Violence Act was allowed to expire in 1953 and was repealed in 1973 to be reintroduced under the Prevention of Terrorism (Temporary Provisions) Act 1973.

In 2000, the Acts were replaced with the more permanent Terrorism Act 2000, which contained many of their powers, and then the Prevention of Terrorism Act 2005.  See also Terrorism (Northern Ireland) Act 2006.

Powers contained in the Acts 
Section 8 of the Prevention of Terrorism (Temporary Provisions) Act 1974 provided for temporary powers to examine of persons travelling between Northern Ireland and Great Britain, both within the UK and the Common Travel Area. Schedule 7 of the Terrorism Act 2000 provides for similar powers that remains in force.

The Prevention of Terrorism (Temporary Provisions) Act 1989 had seven parts:

 Proscribed Organisations  Allowed for organisations to be made illegal, making membership an arrestable offence. It was also an offence to soliciting financial support for any listed group, display signs of public support, or attend a meeting supporting a listed group or addressed by a group member. The maximum penalty was ten years' imprisonment and an unlimited fine. The initial groups outlawed were the Provisional Irish Republican Army (IRA) and the Irish National Liberation Army (INLA) and numerous loyalist groups.

 Exclusion Orders  Exclusion orders could be issued "as expedient" to prevent movement within the United Kingdom. Orders were issued against individuals to either prevent them entering or being in Great Britain, to exclude them from Northern Ireland, or to exclude them from the United Kingdom. It was an offence to breach an order or to aid another in effecting entry, the maximum sentence was five years' imprisonment and an unlimited fine.

 Financial Assistance for Terrorism  As well as the provision under the first part of the Act, contributing, receiving or soliciting financial support for proscribed groups was an offence under this part also. Additionally, it was an offence to contribute any other resources; to assist in the retention or control of funds for proscribed groups or terrorist acts; or to fail to disclose to the police any suspicions notwithstanding any other restriction. The maximum penalty was fourteen years' imprisonment and an unlimited fine.

 Arrest, Detention and Control of Entry  This part allowed for the arrest of individuals without a warrant and on reasonable suspicion that they were guilty of an offence under the Act or otherwise "concerned in the commission, preparation or instigation of acts of terrorism". The period of initial detention was up to 48 hours, this could be extended by a maximum of five additional days by the Home Secretary. The detainee was exempted from certain provisions of other Acts relating to the arrest procedure and the legal protection of those arrested. This part also allowed for streamlined search procedures of persons or property and checks under the Act on persons at port or other border controls.

The remaining parts of the Act (Information, Proceedings and Interpretation, Further Provisions for Northern Ireland, and Supplementary) are largely technical, although the Northern Ireland provisions extend the right to search property, restricts remission for those convicted of statutory offences, and tightens control over the granting of licenses under the Explosives Act 1875 (new explosives factories and magazines).

Censorship 
In 1980, the BBC's Panorama filmed the IRA on patrol in Carrickmore. The footage was seized by police under the Prevention of Terrorism Acts following an outcry in parliament and the press. They were also used to convict Channel 4 and an independent production company over a Dispatches report in 1991 under new powers in the 1989 revision.

History of the Acts 
The first Act was enacted in 1974 following the IRA bombing campaigns of the early 1970s. The Act was introduced by Roy Jenkins, then Home Secretary, as a severe and emergency reaction to the Birmingham pub bombs. The apparent chronology was that there were pub bombings by the IRA in Birmingham on 21 November 1974. 21 people died and 184 were injured. There was a strong desire to respond to what was perceived as "the greatest threat [to the country] since the end of the Second World War." (H.C. Debs. Vol. 882 col. 743 28 November 1974, Mr. Lyons.)  The conception of the Bill was announced on 25 November, when the Home Secretary warned that: "The powers... are Draconian.  In combination they are unprecedented in peacetime." (Ibid. col. 35 25 November 1974, Mr. Jenkins). Parliament was supportive and had passed the Bill by 29 November, virtually without amendment or dissent. The Bill passed through the Commons on 28 and 29 November and passed through Lords on 29 November. In fact, much of the Bill had been drafted in secrecy during the previous year, as shown in the only full length television commentary on the legislation by Clive Walker.

The Philips commission on Criminal Procedure, published 1981, had a significant impact on the subsequent 1984 legislation.

It was rewritten in 1976, 1984 and again in 1989, but continued to stay as emergency 'temporary' powers, that had to be renewed each year. The first three Acts all contained final date clauses beyond the annual renewal, this provision was not included in the 1989 Act.

See also
 Terrorism Acts since 2000
 Diplock courts
 Royal Commission on Criminal Procedure, 1981
 Censorship in the United Kingdom
 1988–1994 British broadcasting voice restrictions

References

External links
Prevention of Terrorism.com Anti-terrorism, pro-liberty website and information
The origins of Emergency Powers Acts in the UK, Statewatch
Civil Liberties, Terrorism, and Liberal Democracy:Lessons from the United Kingdom by Laura K. Donohue

UK legislation 

Acts of the Parliament of the United Kingdom
Acts of the Parliament of the United Kingdom concerning Northern Ireland
Terrorism laws in the United Kingdom
The Troubles (Northern Ireland)
Repealed United Kingdom Acts of Parliament
Censorship of broadcasting in the United Kingdom